Sergei Viktorovich Dolmatov (born 20 May 1980) is a former Russian professional football player.

Club career
Dolmatov played for FC Metallurg Lipetsk in the Russian Football National League and Russian Second Division from 2001 through 2010.

References

External links
 

1980 births
Sportspeople from Lipetsk
Living people
Russian footballers
Association football midfielders
FC Metallurg Lipetsk players
FC Tekstilshchik Ivanovo players